The Norfolk Southern–Gregson Street Overpass, also known as the 11-foot-8 Bridge, is a railroad bridge in Durham, North Carolina, United States. Built in 1940, the bridge allows passenger and freight trains to cross over South Gregson Street in downtown Durham.

Despite numerous warning signs about the low clearance, a large number of trucks, buses, and RVs have collided with the overpass at high speed, tearing off roof fixtures, and at times shearing off the trucks' roofs, earning the bridge the nicknames the "Can Opener" and the "Gregson Street Guillotine".

The bridge gained fame as a nearby office worker, Jürgen Henn, set up cameras in 2008 to track the collisions with the bridge. Henn has recorded 178 collisions with the bridge, including those after the bridge raising, and  the YouTube channel he set up to showcase his recordings has 264,000 subscribers and more than 80 million views.

Despite the number of crashes, a March 2014 report stated that only three injuries had been recorded, making rebuilding of the bridge a low-priority concern.

History
The bridge was designed in the 1920s and built in 1940 by the Southern Railway. The railroad is located near various industrial buildings that at one time hosted tobacco and textile businesses.

As early as the 1960s, several low bridges in Durham were an impediment to the area's industry as larger trucks began supplementing rail haulage. The bridge on Gregson Street in particular was deemed "the granddaddy stopper-of-them-all", having collided with trucks at least seven times and causing $20,000 ($ in 2021) worth of damage in 1968. North Carolina attempted to fix the problem but was unable to obtain federal funding; the accepted method of ameliorating the problem at the time was to dig for the road to go deeper, given that the Railway could not afford to rebuild the bridge altogether. As years passed, this option would eventually become impractical, as it would require moving sewer lines and water pipes below the road surface, which would come at a high cost and cause important utilities to be shut down for weeks to months.

Official actions

The state of North Carolina owns the North Carolina Railroad Company, which owns the land and the bridge. North Carolina Railroad owns no rolling stock, but leases tracks to Amtrak and Norfolk Southern Railway. A heavy steel crash beam protects the bridge from over-height trucks but does not prevent crashes or protect the trucks, instead acting to create a "can opener effect" equivalent to the opening of a sardine can where the top of the over-height truck is peeled back from its frame. The crash beam has been hit so often that it had to be replaced at least once.

The problem is complicated by the location of Peabody Street, which runs parallel to the tracks, and intersects Gregson, just before the bridge. Not all trucks traveling on Gregson will continue under the bridge. Some large trucks must turn right onto Peabody to make their deliveries. Over-height trucks are allowed on Gregson, as long as they turn just before the bridge.

New traffic signal
In May 2016, the city attempted to solve the problem by installing a traffic signal at the intersection, and removing the yellow warning beacons. When an over-height vehicle approaches, the signal cycles to red and a blank-out sign affixed to the signal's mast arm illuminates and flashes the message "OVERHEIGHT MUST TURN" in white. The signal will eventually turn green even if the over-height vehicle chooses not to turn. The signal's long delay was intended to notify drivers that their vehicles would not fit under the bridge. On May 12, 2016, the signal was implemented. No additional crashes occurred until July 7, 2016. Trucks have continued to hit the bridge, possibly because the local buses fit underneath, despite the sensors displaying the overheight message. Drivers of other vehicles may think that the "OVERHEIGHT MUST TURN" warning is triggered by a nearby vehicle, instead of their own vehicle. In some cases, the over-height object is merely an air conditioning unit or vent on a RV, which may be too small for the sensor to detect.

Traffic separation study
In 2014, the North Carolina Department of Transportation Rail Division and the City of Durham began a "Traffic Separation Study" of 18 rail crossings over a  section of the railroad. Gregson Street is in the middle of that section of track but was not mentioned in the study. The study focused on eliminating at-grade crossings, not on fixing grade-separated crossings such as the one at Gregson. There have been four deaths and two other injuries in the study area since 1991, compared to only three minor injuries at Gregson.

Local news have also reported crashes at this site.

Raising
It was further stated that the grade had to be improved for safety reasons to allow the trains to go faster. The entire project was expected to take two weeks to complete, although the actual raising on October 30, 2019, only took eight hours.

The new height is still far lower than the typical bridge clearance, so the system of warning signals and the guard barrier remained in place.  Twenty-two days after it was raised, another collision occurred on November 26, 2019.  The bridge continues to snag some vehicles as captured by the 11'8" website.

Media and internet coverage

Jürgen Henn, who works in a nearby office, mounted several video cameras to record the crashes from different angles. Since April 2008, he has recorded over 100 crashes, and posted them on YouTube. The videos gradually attracted the attention of a local TV station, and eventually progressed to international media attention. 

The bridge is only one of several under-height bridges in the area that trucks frequently crash into; however, the videos became popular, and brought this particular bridge to international media attention, including front-page coverage in The Wall Street Journal, on an episode of the Comedy Central television show Tosh.0, on an episode of the CBC Radio radio program As It Happens in Canada, on the Portuguese language Brazilian TerraTV, on Stuff in New Zealand, in the Hebrew language Israeli newspaper , in the Spanish language Peruvian newspaper , on the Irish iRadio, in the Danish newspaper , on news.com.au in Australia, on the Italian language radio station Rai Radio 2, on the French television news channel , and on a video by popular YouTuber videogamedunkey.

In April 2019, the camera captured the sound of a nearby gas explosion which killed two and injured 25 people.

See also 
 List of bridges known for strikes
 Structure gauge § Crashes

Notes

References

External links

 
  (12-minute documentary about bridge and Henn's website)

Buildings and structures in Durham, North Carolina
Railroad bridges in North Carolina
Beam bridges
Viral videos
Transportation in Durham, North Carolina
Steel bridges in the United States
Bridges completed in 1940
Bridges with frequent bridge strikes